Eretmocera cyanosoma is a moth of the family Scythrididae. It was described by Edward Meyrick in 1910. It is found on Sumba and Java.

The forewings are indigo-blackish with a pale yellow spot in the disc at one-third, one on the dorsum towards the tornus, and one on the costa at three-fourths. The hindwings are dark purple-fuscous.

The larvae have been recorded feeding on Amaranthus species.

References

cyanosoma
Moths described in 1910